Yang Geum-seok (born January 22, 1961) is a South Korean actress.

Filmography

Film

Television series

Variety show

Awards and nominations

References

External links 
 
 
 

1961 births
Living people
South Korean television actresses
South Korean film actresses